Puls (stylized in all lowercase) is a San Franciscobased startup founded by Eyal Ronen and Itai Hirsch in 2015.

Overview 
The company provides in-home services like repairs of all household appliances. The user books an appointment, and a technician visits the user’s location to try and fix it.

History 
Started in 2015, the company was initially launched as CellSavers. The company was focused on repairing mobile phones and tablets. In 2017, the company was renamed Puls and started to offer broader solutions. Puls launched a new service, installation of HDTV antennas in 2018.

In August 2018, following a $50m C round investment, Puls announced expansion to additional home services or supporting "Everything with an 'ON' Switch". In September 2018, Puls was selected by LinkedIn as one of the top 25 US startups, at the 11th place. In 2019, TV-maker TCL announced it had partnered with Puls to provide a 5,000-person installation support team.

In February 2023, Puls announced the launch of their Generative AI assistant, a AI tool using natural language processing to understand and respond to users home care questions in order to provide real time support time and price estimates.

Offered Services

Partners 
Apple partnered with Puls to provide home-based Genius Bartype repairs and demonstrations to the customers.

In January 2018 Antop announced a partnership with Puls for HDTV antenna installation service.

Puls attracts great to satisfactory feedback, with Facebook showing an average feedback score of 4.1/5 stars, with 5,5443 reviews, as of January 2023. Many reviewers speak highly of the fast booking to appointment time, prompt, courteous and knowledgeable technicians and speedy repair times. Similar sentiments are on Better Business Bureau, which gives 3.88/5 stars with 480 reviews.

Finance 
Announced in August 2018, the company raised $50m from Temasek Holdings as the lead investor. In August 2017, the startup raised about $25 million series B round led by Red Dot Capital Partners along with Samsung Next, Maverick Ventures and Kreos Capital, as well as existing investors Sequoia Capital and Carmel Ventures, who previously invested $15 million Series A round in August 2016. Prior to that, it had raised $3 million in a seed round from Sequoia Capital in December 2015.

References

External links
 
 

Technology companies based in the San Francisco Bay Area
Internet properties established in 2015
Online marketplaces of the United States
Privately held companies of the United States
Freelance marketplace websites
Location-based software
Employment websites in the United States